Hubbard Independent School District is a public school district based in the community of Hubbard, Texas (USA) which is located 5 miles south of DeKalb on US 259.

The district has one school that serves students in grades pre-kindergarten though eight.

In 2009, the school district was rated "recognized" by the Texas Education Agency.

History
The district changed to a four day school week in fall 2022.

References

External links
Hubbard ISD

School districts in Bowie County, Texas